Flash Gordon is a short-lived science fiction television series that debuted on Sci-Fi in the United States on August 10, 2007 and continued airing new episodes through February 8, 2008. It has also appeared on the British/Ireland variant of Sci-Fi and Space in Canada. The series was developed by Peter Hume, who served as executive producer/show runner and wrote the first and last episodes, among others.

Plot 
The series was loosely based on the comic strip of the same name and incorporated elements from several previous adaptations, following the adventures of Steven "Flash" Gordon (Eric Johnson), a twenty-five-year-old who lives with his mother and whose scientist father was lost in a mysterious accident when Flash was 13 years old. Flash's ex-girlfriend, Dale Arden (Gina Holden), is a television news reporter and is engaged to police detective Joe Wylee. They introduce Gordons' eccentric former assistant, Hans Zarkov (Jody Racicot), when rifts in space appear, allowing travel between Earth and the planet Mongo.

Mongo is ruled by the ruthless dictator Ming (John Ralston), who controls "Source Water", the only source of safe drinking water on Mongo. Unlike the previous adaptations, he is not normally called "the Merciless" and is instead called "Benevolent Father", though he is still called "the Merciless" in closed circles. He also exhibits the traits of modern, media-savvy dictators, rather than the more simplistic, stereotypically evil characterization of earlier incarnations. Also, unlike previous depictions, Ming resembles a blond Caucasian human, rather than a bald East Asian man. Ming has a daughter, Princess Aura (Anna van Hooft), who is disturbed by her father's brutality. The series adds a new non-Terran character, Baylin (Karen Cliche), a bounty hunter from Mongo. She finds herself trapped on Earth and becomes a comrade of Flash, Dale and Zarkov and their guide to Mongo and its inhabitants.

The peoples of Mongo live in "cantons", tribal groups that echo the animal-human hybrids of the original comic strip. The cantons include the Verdan (based on Prince Barin's forest-dwelling people from the strip), the Turin (based on the strip's Lion Men), the Dactyls (the series' version of the strip's Hawkmen), the Omadrians (women who create powerful medicines), the Frigians (who live in the frozen wastelands), the Tritons (who live beneath the ocean), and the Zurn (painted blue "Magic Men" led by Queen Azura). There is also another group known as the Deviates, mutants whose ancestors drank "Grey Water" (toxic water) to survive. The Deviates are led by Terek, their unofficial king (and Aura's brother) and are distrusted by almost everyone.

Cast

Main 
 Eric Johnson as Steven "Flash" Gordon
 Gina Holden as Dale Arden
 Karen Cliche as Baylin
 Jody Racicot as Dr. Hans Zarkov
 John Ralston as Ming
 Jonathan Lloyd Walker as Rankol

Recurring 
 Anna Van Hooft as Princess Aura
 Panou as Nick Gilmore
 Giles Panton as Joe Wylee
 Jill Teed as Norah Gordon
 Carmen Moore as Joely Lavant
 Carrie Genzel as Vestra
 Craig Stanghetta as Terek
 Steve Bacic as Prince Barin
 Ty Olsson as Prince Vultan
 Jody Thompson as Queen Azura

Episodes

Broadcast
Flash Gordon was canceled in April 2008. Re-runs of the show began airing weekly on ION Television on August 1, 2008.

Reception 
The show was not well received. Metacritic gave the show an average score of 35/100 based on reviews from 13 critics. UK science fiction magazine SFX described episode 3 as "possibly the worst episode of anything, ever", and as part of their 200th issue features, they named the series as the worst they had ever reviewed. The New York Post gave the show 0 stars describing it as "a disgrace to the name of the enduring comic-strip-character-turned-movie-and-TV space hero". Another UK science fiction magazine, TV Zone, in a review for episode 13, stated "the series continues to improve, and you start to see the meaning in the producers' madness - they must have hoped they could lull passing viewers into watching Sci-Fi with pedestrian, mainstream plots, before building up a world of Dune-like complexity...which might even have worked if the early episodes hadn't been so dire that no-one but reviewers are still watching". When the show premiered in the UK, the magazine recommended it to readers, noting "you may well be wondering, considering the vitriol of our early reviews of the series, why we're picking out Flash Gordon as something to watch out for. Well, the point is that while the early episodes are dire...this is one series that does eventually—and we mean eventually—reward patience and endurance".

Home media 
In August 2007, Best Buy offered an exclusive DVD that included "The Premiere Episode", selected deleted scenes (with incomplete effects) and a gallery of series concept art. This release includes the truncated 65-minute version of the pilot, exactly as it aired on Sci-Fi four days prior. Subsequent DVD releases include the full 87-minute version of the pilot, split into two parts.

Phase 4 Films released the complete series on DVD in Region 1 (Canada only) in July 2009. The 5-disc set features all 22 episodes of the series.

Mill Creek Entertainment has released the complete series on DVD in the USA in April 2013.

In other media

CD releases 
In February 2014, Perseverance Records released a CD containing selected cues by composer Michael Picton. A second album was released in May, with the final volume scheduled for later in the year.

References

External links 
 SCI FI Digital Press Day, Cast Video
 Transcription of The Great Sorrow speech
 Jonathon Lloyd Walker (Rankol) Interview at www.sci-fi-online.com
 
 

2000s American science fiction television series
2007 American television series debuts
2008 American television series endings
2000s Canadian science fiction television series
2007 Canadian television series debuts
2008 Canadian television series endings
American action adventure television series
American fantasy television series
American fantasy drama television series
Canadian action adventure television series
Canadian fantasy television series
Canadian fantasy drama television series
Flash Gordon television series
Space adventure television series
Syfy original programming
Television shows filmed in Vancouver
Television series set on fictional planets
English-language television shows